wsRadio (World Syndicated Radio) is an Internet talk radio network which started broadcasting on August 15, 2001 with 5 shows and grew to over 120 shows. Broadcasting 24 hours a day, 7 days a week, "the Sun never sets on wsRadio.com." In 2008, wsRadio had over $1 million in advertising revenue, including eBay Radio and PayPal Radio. By early 2021, the station had closed down.

Notable shows
The Peggy Smedley Show, the voice of M2M and connected devices
APS Stamp Talk show for the world of stamp collectors, from the American Philatelic Society
Computer and Technology Radio with Marc Cohen and Marsha Collier
The Coaching Show, providing insights and best practices for the professional coaching community
Leadership Insights Radio, profiling successful and influential business leaders
PriceWaterhouseCoopers' Start-Up Show exploring Venture Capital Opportunities
Randy Jones on Baseball with Randy Jones and Joe Tutino
Washington Times Inside the Beltway Radio with journalist John McCaslin - archives June 2008 to May 2009
 The San Diego Union~Tribune Community Spotlight Show showcasing local non-profits and organizations

References

External links
 wsRadio blog
 Official website (archived)
 Alexa site info . Alexa Internet

Internet radio in the United States